Katrin Schröder (born 10 July 1967) is a retired East German rower who won a silver medal in the eights at the 1989 World Rowing Championships. She competed at the 1988 Summer Olympics in the coxless pairs, together with Kerstin Spittler, and finished in fourth place.

References

1967 births
Living people
East German female rowers
Olympic rowers of East Germany
Rowers at the 1988 Summer Olympics
Sportspeople from Magdeburg
World Rowing Championships medalists for East Germany